The 1991 Tivoli Milk Masters season was the 17th season of the franchise in the Philippine Basketball Association (PBA). Formerly known as Presto Tivoli Ice Cream in the First Conference.

Draft picks

Notable dates
March 19: The Tivolis break out of a four-game losing slump with a 119-113 victory over Diet Sarsi.  

March 26: Presto scored its fourth win in nine games in a 122-116 victory against Purefoods Hotdogs.

Scoring record
April 4: Import Dwayne McClain scored 74 points in the Tivolis' 117-118 loss to Alaska Milk.

November 21: Allan Caidic achieved a milestone when he surpassed the record for most points by a local player in scoring 79 points in Tivoli's 162–149 win over Ginebra San Miguel, Caidic made 37 points in the second quarter alone and tallied 42 in the second half to break his previous record of 41 points shared with once teammate Ricardo Brown. The Milkmasters dropped out of contention in the Third Conference after losing their first five semifinal assignments. They won their last three outings, highlighted by the 79-point output of Allan Caidic in their last game of the season.

Roster

Transactions

Trades

Additions

Recruited imports

References

Great Taste Coffee Makers seasons
Tivoli